Mesotype is a genus of moths in the family Geometridae erected by Jacob Hübner in 1825. It is sometimes included in Perizoma.

Selected species
 Mesotype didymata (Linnaeus, 1758) – twin-spot carpet
 Mesotype parallelolineata (Retzius, 1783)
 Mesotype verberata (Scopoli, 1763)

References

Perizomini